John Hayden (1794-1855) was a nineteenth century  Anglican priest.

Gough was born in County Kilkenny and educated at Trinity College, Dublin, graduating BA in 1814 and Master of Arts in 1840.He was Archdeacon of Derry from 1849 until his death.

References

1855 deaths
1794 births
Archdeacons of Derry
Alumni of Trinity College Dublin
People from County Kilkenny